Donn Barber FAIA (October 19, 1871 – May 29, 1925) was an American architect.

Biography

Barber was born on October 19, 1871 in Washington DC, the son of  Charles Gibbs Barber, and the grandson of Hiram Barber. 

He studied at Holbrook Military Academy in Ossining, New York, and graduated from Yale University in 1893, where he was chairman of campus humor magazine The Yale Record and a member of the Berzelius Society.

After Yale, he took post-graduate architectural courses at Columbia University, and at the École des Beaux-Arts in Paris under Paul Blondell and Scellier de Gisors.  He was the ninth American student to receive a diploma.

After returning and serving apprenticeships in the offices of Carrere & Hastings, Cass Gilbert and Lord & Hewlett, he set up his own firm around 1900. In 1923, Barber was elected into the National Academy of Design as an Associate member.

In 1899 Barber married Elsie Yandell of Louisville, the sister of sculptor Enid Yandell.

He died on May 29, 1925 in Manhattan, New York City.

Work
Barber's designs include:
 Terminal Station, built 1908, 1434 Market St., Chattanooga, TN, NRHP-listed
 Berzelius Society building, Yale University, New Haven, Connecticut, 1910
 Connecticut State Library and Supreme Court Building, built 1908–1910, 231 Capitol Ave., Hartford, CT (with E.T. Hapgood) NRHP-listed
 Lotos Club, 110 West 57th Street, New York, New York, 1909
 Village Hall, 16–20 Croton Avenue, Ossining, New York, 1914
 Travelers Tower, downtown Hartford, Connecticut, 1919
 the New York Cotton Exchange, New York, New York, 1923 (from a 1912 competition design)
 Capital City Club, 7 Harris St., NW, Atlanta, GA, NRHP-listed
 The Hartford Times Building, downtown Hartford, Connecticut 
 The Hartford Aetna National Bank, Aetna Life Insurance, in Hartford
 The Department of Justice Building in Washington, D.C.
 and in Manhattan: the National Park Bank, the Mutual Bank, the Institute of Musical Art.

Gallery

References

External links
 
 Donn Barber works. Held by the Department of Drawings & Archives, Avery Architectural & Fine Arts Library, Columbia University.

19th-century American architects
1871 births
1925 deaths
Burials at Sleepy Hollow Cemetery
Columbia Graduate School of Architecture, Planning and Preservation alumni
Yale University alumni
American alumni of the École des Beaux-Arts
Fellows of the American Institute of Architects
20th-century American architects
People from Washington, D.C.